Vito Petrella (born 12 April 1965) is a former Italian sprinter who specialized in the 400 metres.

Biography
He won four medals at the International athletics competitions, all with the national relays team. He has 20 national team caps, from 1986 to 1992. In 1988, his magic year, Vito Petrella ran 46"37 indoors, he also ran 10"8 in the 100 metres and 21"39 in the 200 metres.
His 400 metres personal best time is 46"15 seconds, achieved in August 1988 in Sestriere. However, his best outdoor performance was probably one month before in Turin when, although running in the first lane, he ran in 46"17 winning the 400 metres at the Italian Championship for Clubs. He was trained by Graziano Della Valle in Pavia together with Tiziano Gemelli (46"31) and Marco Michieli (47"04), who belonged to the same sport club.

Achievements

National titles
He has won one time the individual national championship.
1 win in the 400 metres indoor (1987)

See also
 Italy national relay team

References

External links
 

1965 births
Living people
Sportspeople from Gloucester
Italian male sprinters
Universiade medalists in athletics (track and field)
World Athletics Championships athletes for Italy
Mediterranean Games gold medalists for Italy
Athletes (track and field) at the 1987 Mediterranean Games
Mediterranean Games medalists in athletics
Universiade bronze medalists for Italy
World Athletics Indoor Championships medalists
Medalists at the 1991 Summer Universiade